Ke Huy Quan (born August 20, 1971), also known as Jonathan Ke Quan, is an American actor. As a young actor, Quan rose to fame playing Short Round in Indiana Jones and the Temple of Doom (1984) and Data in The Goonies (1985). Following a few roles in the 1990s, Quan took an almost 20-year acting hiatus during which he worked as a stunt choreographer and assistant director. He returned to acting with the science fiction film Everything Everywhere All at Once (2022). His performance was widely praised and won him many accolades, including an Oscar, Critics Choice, Golden Globe, Independent Spirit, and SAG Award.

Early life and education

Ke Huy Quan was born on August 20, 1971, in Saigon, South Vietnam. He was born into a family of Chinese descent with eight siblings. In 1975, the North Vietnamese occupied the South and unified Vietnam; three years later, Quan fled from Vietnam with his family. He, along with his father and five siblings, fled to Hong Kong, while Quan's mother and three other siblings went to Malaysia. After staying at a refugee camp in Hong Kong, Quan's entire family was admitted to the United States as part of the Refugee Admissions Program in 1979. In the U.S., Quan grew up in California, where he attended the Mount Gleason Junior High School in Sunland-Tujunga, Los Angeles and the Alhambra High School in Alhambra.

Quan subsequently studied film at the University of Southern California's School of Cinematic Arts, where he produced, shot and edited a comedy horror short film titled Voodoo alongside fellow student Gregg Bishop, who directed the film. Voodoo won the Audience Award at the 2000 Slamdance Film Festival, and continues to be shown to USC students to this day. After graduating from university in 1999, Quan worked with Hong Kong action choreographer Corey Yuen on the 2000 superhero film X-Men, starting a career of working on films as an assistant fight choreographer and assistant director.

Career

1984–1997: Career breakthrough with Indiana Jones 

Quan became a child actor at age of 12, starring as Harrison Ford's sidekick Short Round in Indiana Jones and the Temple of Doom in 1984. The casting director auditioned a number of children at Castelar Elementary School, including Quan's younger brother. In 1985, he co-starred in The Goonies as a member of the eponymous group of children, the inventor Richard "Data" Wang. He played a pickpocket orphan in the 1986 Taiwanese movie It Takes a Thief. In 1987, he appeared in the Japanese movie Passengers with the Japanese idol singer Honda Minako. He played Sam on the short-lived TV series Together We Stand (1986–1987) and played Jasper Kwong in the sitcom Head of the Class from 1990 to 1991.

In 1991 he starred in the movie Breathing Fire, and had a small role in Encino Man the following year. He played the starring role in the 1993 Mandarin-language Taiwan TV show Eunuch & Carpenter which ran for forty episodes. He also starred in the 1996 Hong Kong-Vietnam co-production Red Pirate. He  studied Taekwondo under Philip Tan on the set of Indiana Jones and the Temple of Doom, and later trained under Tao-liang Tan.

1998–2018: Transition into film production 
As an adult, Quan found it difficult to find acting work in the United States. He eventually quit acting and enrolled in the film program at University of Southern California. After graduating from USC, Quan was asked by Corey Yuen to go to Toronto, Ontario, to help choreograph fighting sequences in X-Men (2000). For the next decade, he worked behind the scenes on various productions in Asia and the United States. He again helped Yuen as a stunt choreographer for The One (2001). Quan worked as assistant director on Wong Kar-wai's 2046 (2004).

2018–present: Return to acting 
Quan was inspired to return to acting following the success of Crazy Rich Asians in 2018.<ref>{{cite news |last=McEvoy |first=Colin |title=Oscar Frontrunner Ke Huy Quan Had Quit Acting for Good. 'Crazy Rich Asians Brought Him Back. |work=Biography.com |date=March 8, 2023 |url=https://www.biography.com/actors/a43236892/how-crazy-rich-asians-inspired-ken-huy-quan-return-to-acting |accessdate=March 8, 2023 |archive-date=March 8, 2023 |archive-url=https://web.archive.org/web/20230308192844/https://www.biography.com/actors/a43236892/how-crazy-rich-asians-inspired-ken-huy-quan-return-to-acting |url-status=live }}</ref> That same year, filmmaking duo Daniels began casting for their film Everything Everywhere All at Once. They struggled to cast an actor in the role of Waymond Wang, a character who would appear in three different incarnations in the film. Co-director Daniel Kwan stumbled upon Quan on Twitter. Two weeks after getting a talent agent, the actor received a call to audition for the film. In January 2020, Quan was announced as a cast member of Everything Everywhere All at Once. 

The film was released in March 2022 to overwhelming acclaim, with Quan's performance receiving near unanimous praise and media attention, eventually leading to him winning a Golden Globe, a Screen Actors Guild Award and an Academy Award for his role. The Screen Actors Guild Award win made him the first Asian man to win any individual category at the Screen Actors Guild Awards, with his win of the Screen Actors Guild Award for Outstanding Performance by a Male Actor in a Supporting Role. He was the first Vietnamese-American actor to be nominated in that category. Quan is one of two actors of Asian descent to win an Academy Award for Best Supporting Actor, the other being Haing S. Ngor in 1985. Quan also became the first Vietnam-born actor to win an Oscar. With his win at the 2023 Screen Actors' Guild Awards, he became the first Asian man to win in the category of supporting actor for film.

In 2019 he was cast in a supporting role in the Netflix film Finding ʻOhana, released in 2021. Quan approached director Jude Weng after overhearing her describing the film as The Goonies meets Indiana Jones, in both of which Quan had appeared. In February 2022, it was announced that he had joined the cast of the TV adaptation of American Born Chinese for Disney+. In September 2022, Quan was announced to have joined the cast for the second season of the Marvel Cinematic Universe series Loki for Disney+.

Personal life
Quan is of Han Chinese ancestry from the Hoa ethnic minority group of Vietnam. He is fluent in English, Cantonese, Mandarin, and Vietnamese. Quan is married to Echo Quan, who served as the on-set translator for Everything Everywhere All at Once, and resides in Woodland Hills, Los Angeles. He remains close friends with his Goonies co-star Jeff Cohen, who is also Quan's entertainment lawyer and who helped Quan negotiate his contract to star in Everything Everywhere All at Once.

Filmography
Film

Other credits

Television

Awards and nominations

In 2023, Quan won a Golden Globe Award and an Academy Award, for Best Supporting Actor, for his role in Everything Everywhere All at Once (2022). Notably, he was the first Asian man to win any individual category at the Screen Actors Guild Awards for the same role, as well as the first Vietnamese-American actor to be nominated in the supporting category.

 See also 
 Asian Americans in arts and entertainment
 List of Asian Academy Award winners and nominees

References

Bibliography
 Holmstrom, John. The Moving Picture Boy: An International Encyclopaedia from 1895 to 1995''. Norwich, Michael Russell, 1996, p. 387.

External links

 
 

20th-century American male actors
21st-century American male actors
1971 births
American film actors of Asian descent
American male actors of Chinese descent
American male child actors
American male film actors
American male taekwondo practitioners
American male television actors
Best Supporting Actor Academy Award winners
Best Supporting Actor Golden Globe (film) winners
Hoa people
Living people
Naturalized citizens of the United States
Outstanding Performance by a Cast in a Motion Picture Screen Actors Guild Award winners
People from Alhambra, California
People from Ho Chi Minh City
Refugees in Hong Kong
USC School of Cinematic Arts alumni
Vietnamese emigrants to the United States
Vietnamese people of Chinese descent
Vietnamese refugees